is a Japanese anime director, storyboard artist, and sound director.

Credits
Credits include:
My Neighbor Totoro (1988; Assistant Director)
Jankenman (1991-1992; Director, Screenplay, Storyboard, Episode Director)
Floral Magician Mary Bell (1992-1993; Director, Script, Storyboard, Episode Director)
Yaiba (1993-1994; Director, Storyboard)
Chō Kuse ni Narisō (1994-1995; Director)
Mojacko (1995-1997; Director)
Serial Experiments Lain (Video game) (1998; Director, Storyboard)
Hikaru no Go (2001-2003; Director (episodess 58-75), Storyboard (Opening 3; episodes 16-24 even, 27, 30, 36, 41, 43, 48-54 even, 60, 66, 74-75), Episode Director (episodes 16-24 even, 27–28, 30-36 even, 39, 41, 43, 48-54 even, 60, 66, 74-75), Unit Director (OP 3), Art (eps 18-24 even, 30)
Saiyuki Reload (2003-2004; Director, Storyboards, Series Story Editor, Sound Director)
Saiyuki Gunlock (2004; Director, Series Story Editor, Sound Director)
Mahō Sensei Negima! (2005; Storyboards, Episode Director)
Petopeto-san (2005; Storyboards (episodes 2, 6), Episode Director (episode 1))
Kōtetsu Sangokushi (2007; Chief Director)
Digimon Fusion (2010-2012; Series Director, Storyboard (episodes 37, 43, 49), Episode Director (episodes 1, 12, 54))
ARP Backstage Pass (2020; Director)

References

External links
 

1960 births
Anime character designers
Anime directors
People from Tokyo
Living people